The flag of the state of North Carolina, often referred to as the North Carolina flag, N.C. flag, or North Star, is the state flag of the U.S. state of North Carolina.

History

First flag (1861–1865) 

North Carolina did not have an official state flag until the North Carolinian state constitutional convention of 1861. During this convention, delegates voted to join the Confederacy. They established a committee to come up with a flag. This flag was ratified by the convention on June 22, 1861. The flag consisted of a red field with a white star in the center. Inscribed above the star was the date May 20, 1775, the controversial date of the Mecklenburg Declaration of Independence.  Inscribed below the star in a semi-circular form was the date May 20, 1861, which was the date North Carolina declared it had seceded from the Union. The flag also contained two bars of equal width, one in blue and one in white. The design is similar to one suggested by Raleigh artist William G. Browne.

During the American Civil War, secessionist leaders spoke of the Mecklenburg Declaration with reverence, attempting to connect it with the state's joining the Confederacy. Confederate leader Jefferson Davis spoke to a Charlotte crowd in September 1864, saying "people of this section were the first to defy British authority and declare themselves free" encouraging them to continue backing the Confederacy's civil war effort.

Flag Statute of 1885 

A former Confederate soldier and adjutant general of North Carolina (18771888), Johnston Jones, introduced the bill which led the state legislature to adopt a new flag in March 1885, to replace the flag that had been adopted on June 22, 1861. The red field of the old flag was replaced by a blue field.  This was the first and only flag formally representing the State of North Carolina as part of the United States.

The flag of the State of North Carolina was adopted by statute of the North Carolina General Assembly in 1885. It is defined in the general Statute 144-1 as follows:

Flag modification of 1991 

On June 24, 1991, a bill was passed by the North Carolina Senate that changed the official proportions of the state flag. It changed from "… the total length of the flag  shall be one-third more than its width" as written in the 1885 act to "… the total length of the flag shall be one-half more than its width."

Symbolism 

It bears the dates of the Mecklenburg Declaration of Independence (May 20, 1775) and of the Halifax Resolves (April 12, 1776), documents that place North Carolina at the forefront of the American independence movement. Both dates also appear on the Seal of North Carolina.

Salute to the flag 
The General Assembly of North Carolina adopted an official salute to the flag in 2007.  It reads:

References

External links

 
1885 establishments in North Carolina
North Carolina
Flag
North Carolina